CSS Acadia is a former hydrographic surveying and oceanographic research ship of the Hydrographic Survey of Canada and its successor the Canadian Hydrographic Service.

Acadia served Canada for more than five decades from 1913 to 1969, charting the coastline of almost every part of Eastern Canada including pioneering surveys of Hudson Bay. She was also twice commissioned into the Royal Canadian Navy (RCN) as HMCS Acadia, the only ship still afloat to have served the RCN in both World Wars. Today she is a museum ship, designated as a National Historic Site of Canada, moored in Halifax Harbour at the Maritime Museum of the Atlantic.

History
Acadia was designed in Ottawa by Canadian naval architect R.L. Newman for the Hydrographic Survey of Canada and built by Swan Hunter & Wigham Richardson at Newcastle-on-Tyne in England. Named after Acadia, the early colonial name for Atlantic Canada, she was launched on May 8, 1913. Acadia arrived in Halifax on July 8 and was commissioned that July upon her first voyage using the prefix CGS, which stood for "Canadian Government Ship."  She saw extensive use prior to 1917 surveying the waters along Canada's Atlantic coast, including tidal charting and depth soundings for various ports. Her first two seasons were spent charting in Hudson Bay at Port Nelson and the entrance to Hudson Bay to open the way for a grain port for Manitoba. In her first year, she also made the first Canadian surveys of notorious Sable Island and rescued the crew of the steamship Alette, crushed by ice in Hudson Bay, the first of several rescue operations the Acadia would perform. Among her more enduring work was a survey of the Bay of Fundy which became her longest assignment prior to entering military service in World War I.

World War I
After the outbreak of war in 1914, Acadia was among the government vessels used to patrol the Bay of Fundy during the winter months, sailing between Yarmouth, Nova Scotia and Grand Manan. CGS Acadia was commissioned into the Royal Canadian Navy on January 16, 1917, as a patrol vessel, replacing the CGS prefix with HMCS, thus becoming . The vessel was armed with one  gun placed forward. From 1917 until March 1919, she conducted anti-submarine patrols from the Bay of Fundy along Nova Scotia's Atlantic coast and through the Gulf of Saint Lawrence. On December 6, 1917, less than twelve months into her wartime service, HMCS Acadia survived the Halifax Explosion.  Acadia was serving as a guard ship at the entrance to Bedford Basin but suffered only minor damage.  Near the end of the war, she served as a platform for experiments with anti-submarine balloons.

Inter-war period
Following the armistice, HMCS Acadia was returned to the Hydrographic Survey of Canada (renamed the Canadian Hydrographic Service in 1928) where she regained her original prefix CGS Acadia and resumed hydrographic survey work throughout the inter-war period of the 1920s and 1930s.  Lack of survey funds suspended her operation in 1924 and 1925.  In 1926 she resumed surveys and became the first Canadian research vessel to be fitted with an echo sounder.  A major achievement was surveying to establish the port of Churchill, Manitoba.  Acadia also performed pioneering Canadian oceanographic research. In 1929 Acadia rescued the crew of a crashed Sikorsky amphibious aircraft named "Untin Bowler" who were attempting a round-trip to Europe across Greenland and Iceland sponsored by the Chicago Tribune until the aircraft was destroyed by ice off the tip of Labrador.

World War II

CGS Acadia was recommissioned into the Royal Canadian Navy in October 1939, once again becoming HMCS Acadia. She was first used as a training ship for HMCS Stadacona, a shore establishment in Halifax.  From May 1940 to March 1941 she saw active use as a patrol ship off the entrance of Halifax Harbour, providing close escort support for small convoys entering and leaving the port from the harbour limits at the submarine nets off McNabs Island to the "Halifax Ocean Meeting Point".  After a refit, HMCS Acadia was assigned in mid-1941 for use as an anti-aircraft training ship and serving as a gunnery training vessel for crews of the Defensively Equipped Merchant Ships (DEMS) fleet. In June 1944, HMCS Acadia was assigned to the training base  and stationed at the nearby port of Digby, Nova Scotia where she was used for gunnery training for recruits and advanced gunnery training for petty officers and officers. Her wartime name of HMCS Acadia continues in use today for the Sea Cadet summer training camp held at the ship's old base at Cornwallis.

Later years

With the end of the war, HMCS Acadia was paid off by the RCN on November 3, 1945, and returned for the second time to the Canadian Hydrographic Service as CSS Acadia, the new acronym standing for Canadian Survey Ship. A major post-war assignment was updating and expanding the nautical charts of Newfoundland and Labrador after the province joined Canada in 1949.  In 1962, Acadia rescued hundreds of people from forest fires in Newfoundland, evacuating two towns. In addition to her work with the CHS, CSS Acadia participated in military survey assignments for the Royal Navy, Royal Canadian Navy, and United States Navy.  By the end of her career, Acadia had charted almost every region of Atlantic Canada and much of the Eastern Arctic.

Museum ship
She retired from active service on November 28, 1969, and was transferred to the Bedford Institute of Oceanography (BIO) for use as a museum ship.  Acadia was declared a National Historic Site in 1976. On February 9, 1982, the BIO transferred CSS Acadia to the Maritime Museum of the Atlantic for preservation and interpretation.  She is moored at the Museum's North Wharf and opens to visitors from May to October. Acadia is known for being one of the last ships in Halifax that was home to an official ship's cat used for rodent control. Acadia is dry docked every five years to preserve her hull, formerly at the Dartmouth Marine Slips and at Halifax Shipyard in more recent years.

The two nearly identically sized ships present a contrast in shipbuilding eras and offer an ironic comparison as Sackville is a warship which became a part-time hydrographic ship and Acadia is a hydrographic ship which became a part-time warship.

Acadia is the only known vessel still afloat to have survived the Halifax Explosion in 1917. Every year on the December 6 anniversary of the explosion, Acadia hoists the same signal flags she flew on the day of the explosion.

Film roles
Acadia has been used in a number of films to depict other vessels. These include:
 A Japanese destroyer in the 1982 Salter Street Film production South Pacific '42
 A Scottish immigrant vessel in the 1990 film The Little Kidnappers
  in the 1992 Halifax Explosion film Morning of Armageddon
 A World War II merchant ship in the 1992 television show Lifeline to Victory
  in the 1996 docudrama Lusitania
 The ocean liner  in the 1996 PBS American Experience show Rescue at Sea
 A hospital ship in the 1998 short film Halifax 1917
 A 19th century ocean liner in Alexander Keith's Brewery beer commercials in 2000
  in a 2009 NOVA/National Geographic docudrama Darwin's Darkest Hour
 A San Francisco ferry and steam-powered sealing ship in the 2009 miniseries Sea Wolf 
 As both  and the cable ship  in the 2011 docudrama Waking the Titanic.

Crew
Most of Acadias crew came from the Eastern Shore of Nova Scotia. Many served their entire careers aboard, an indication that she was regarded as a "happy ship".  Many of her officers were from Newfoundland. As a hydrographic ship, the Hydrographer in Charge was the senior officer, deciding where Acadia went and what she did. At the same time, the Captain ran the ship's day-to-day operations.  In wartime, naval officers took over.

Hydrographers in Charge

Capt. Frederick Anderson 1913–1916, 1919–1923
R.J. Fraser 1926
J.U. Beauchemin 1927–1939
H.L. Leadman 1946–48
S.R. Titus 1948–1950
C.H. Martin 1950–1955
H. Furuya 1955–1962
J.E.V. Goodwill 1962–1964
L.P. Murdock 1965
R.C. Amero 1966, 1969
P.L. Corkum 1967
T.E. Smith 1968

Captains
Capt. S.W. Bartlett 1913
Capt. W.A. Robson 1914–1924
Capt. J. Roach 1926
Capt. F.V. Ryan 1927–1939
Capt. D.M. Snelgrove 1948–1949
Capt. R.J. Ball 1949–1952
Capt. E.A. Codner 1953
Capt. W.N Kettle 1954–1957
Capt. J.W. Taylor 1958–1969

Naval Commanding Officers
Lt J.O. Boothby, (RCN) 20/2/1940  – 1/4/1940
LCdr H.G. Shadforth (RCNR-Later renamed RCNVR) 12/4/1940  – ?
Lt S. Henderson (RCNR-Later renamed RCNVR) 29/4/1941  – 11/11/1941
LCdr J.L. Diver (RCNR-Later renamed RCNVR)  12/11/1941  – 19/9/1943
LCdr R.V. Campbell (RCNR-Later renamed RCNVR) 20/9/1943  – 15/12/1943
LCdr J.C. Littler (RCNR-Later renamed RCNVR) 16/12/1943  – 30/3/1944
LCdr R.A.S. MacNeil (RCNR-Later renamed RCNVR) 31/3/1944  – 6/6/1944
Skipper/Lt F.W. Durant (RCNR-Later renamed RCNVR) 7/6/1944  – 4/3/1945
Skipper/Lt C.C. Clattenburg (RCNR-Later renamed RCNVR) 5/3/1945 – Decommissioning

Erik the Red
Named after the famous Viking, Erik the Red was a tabby cat, born about 1997, that served on Acadia as the rodent control officer.  He is believed to have been a stray that found his way aboard the ship as a stowaway on Canada Day in 2000.  He initially worked alongside the existing rodent control officer, Clara, until Clara's retirement and quick decline in health.  Erik the Red survived three abductions or disappearances, which were particularly worrisome for the community because Erik had medical concerns requiring daily medication or he would not eat.  Erik became a well known local attraction on the boardwalk near Acadia, welcomed up and down the waterfront and into stores.  Erik retired in 2015 during a party in his honour on September 20 and died in July 2017 after a short illness.

See also
List of museum ships
Ships preserved in museums

References

Sources

External links

 
 Maritime Museum of the Atlantic CSS Acadia web page
 Friends of Canadian Hydrography – CSS Acadia page
 Canadian Navy Heritage – Acadia Photo Archive and Specs
 Haze Grey and Underway – Converted civilian vessels
 Live Webcam view showing CSS Acadia viewed from the north
 Grand Old Lady: A personal tribute to the CSS Acadia by Rod Desborough (2010), published by author: an illustrated history written by a former crew member

Research vessels of Canada
Museum ships in Canada
Museum ships in Nova Scotia
Ships preserved in museums
History of Halifax, Nova Scotia
Military history of Nova Scotia
Transport in Nova Scotia
Water transport in Manitoba
Military history of Newfoundland and Labrador
Maritime history of Canada
National Historic Sites in Nova Scotia
Steamships of Canada
1913 ships
Acadia
Ships built by Swan Hunter
Halifax Explosion ships
Auxiliary ships of the Royal Canadian Navy
Canadian Government Ship